or  or , also spelled //, plural , is an Arabic word meaning "letter", "epistle", "treatise", or "message".
It may refer to:

Literary genre 

, a summary of religious prescriptions in Islamic jurisprudence
, treatise composed during the month of Ramadan by the Da'i al-Mutlaq (spiritual leader) in Tayyibi Isma'ilism

Writings 
 or Treatise of Rights, a work attributed to the Shi'ite Imam Ali ibn al-Husayn Zayn al-Abidin
 or The Golden Treatise, a work on medicine attributed to the Shi'ite Imam Ali ibn Musa al-Rida (765–818)
, a travelogue by Ahmad ibn Fadlan (10th century)
 (Ibn Abi Zayd), a book on Maliki  by Ibn Abi Zayd (10th century)
 or the Epistles of the Brethren of Purity, an encyclopedic collection of philosophical treatises (10th century)
 or The Epistle of Forgiveness, a satirical work of Arabic poetry written by Abu al-ʿAlaʾ al-Maʿarri around 1033
, a Sufi text by al-Qushayri (11th century)
 or the Epistles of Wisdom, a corpus of sacred texts and pastoral letters in Druze tradition (11th century)
 ("The Treatise of Fādil ibn Nātiq"), better known as Theologus Autodidactus, a theological novel written by Ibn al-Nafis between 1268 and 1277
 ("Treatise on Revealing the Truth"), an 1823 Persian-language work by Alexander Kasimovich Kazembek, part of wider 19th-century eastern missionary activity

Media
, Arabic weekly cultural magazine for literature, science, and art, published in Cairo from 1933 to 1953
Al-Resalah Satellite TV, an Arabic Islamic television channel
, the original-language title of the Arabic film The Message (1976 film)
 (newspaper), a conservative daily newspaper in Iran
Risala Weekly, a weekly Islamic magazine published since 1983 in Kozhikode, India

Places
Ar-Risala, a populated place in Baghdad Governorate, Iraq
Resālat, another name for Qaleh Khan, North Khorasan, a village in Iran
Resalat (district), a neighborhood located in the eastern part of Tehran, Iran
Resalat Expressway, the former name of Qasem Soleimani Expressway, an east-west expressway in Tehran, Iran
Risala Bazar or Risala Road, commercial area in Hyderabad, India

Organizations
Al-Resalah Party, a Jordanian political party
Resala Charity Organization, a non-profit organization based in Egypt

See also 
The "message" of Allah to mankind revealed via "messengers"; see 
Risala, Mughal-era term for a cavalry unit commanded by a Risaldar in the Indian and Pakistan armies

ar:الرسالة